Weybourne railway station is a station in Weybourne, Norfolk on the preserved North Norfolk Railway. It was formerly part of the Midland and Great Northern Joint Railway route between Melton Constable and Cromer. Regarded as an iconic Edwardian masterpiece, the station is locally known as "Webbun". The station is open everyday the railway is operating trains, and holds various themed events throughout the year,

The station itself is located over a mile from the centre of the Norfolk village of Weybourne and is closer to Weybourne Heath. It was not originally intended to be the site of a station and opened in 1901 (later than most of the line) at the behest of a local hotel owner.

Appearances on television, film and media
Weybourne railway station (as well as the NNR itself) has been used for filming and on-screen TV appearances, including Walmington-on-Sea railway station in the Dad's Army episode "The Royal Train", as Thruxton in "A Warning to the Curious" in BBC's 1972 "A Ghost Story for Christmas" offering, as Crimpton-on-Sea railway station in the BBC TV sitcom Hi-De-Hi!, as Clayfield railway station in the opening episode of Backs to the Land and the 1985 adaptation of The Moving Finger.

References

Heritage railway stations in Norfolk
Former Midland and Great Northern Joint Railway stations
Railway stations in Great Britain opened in 1901
Railway stations in Great Britain closed in 1964
Railway stations in Great Britain opened in 1975
Beeching closures in England